Donald Daniel Houston (6 November 1923 – 13 October 1991) was a Welsh actor whose first two films—The Blue Lagoon (1949) with Jean Simmons, and A Run for Your Money (1949) with Alec Guinness—were highly successful. Later in his career he was cast in military roles and in comedies such as the Doctor and Carry On series.

Early life
Houston was born in 10 Thomas Street, Tonypandy, on Tuesday 6 November 1923 in the village of Clydach Vale, near Tonypandy, Glamorgan and was the elder brother of actor Glyn Houston and a sister, Jean.

His father Alexander Houston, was a professional football player from Scotland, and his mother Elsie M Jones, ran a milk round.  Following the death of their mother at age 29, Donald and brother Glyn Houston were raised by their grandmother while their father had to leave Wales in order to find work.

After leaving school he worked at a local colliery before deciding to start an acting career. In 1940 he performed on stage with the Pilgrim Players. He served in the Royal Air Force during the Second World War as a rear gunner and radio officer.

Acting career
Houston had a successful career as a character actor in British film and television, with prominent parts in several well-known films, including Yangtse Incident (1957), The Longest Day (1962, in which he appeared alongside Richard Burton), 633 Squadron (1964), Where Eagles Dare (1968, again with Burton) and The Sea Wolves (1981). He would sometimes indulge his Welsh accent, and at other times conceal it behind an English public school voice. His forte tended to be authority figures, often military, such as the brilliant but tough David Caulder, the head of Moonbase 3, or Dr Francis in "Thirteen to Centaurus" (from the anthology series Out of the Unknown).

He could also handle comedy, as he proved with Doctor in the House (1954) and the later Doctor in Distress (1963), both significant successes in Europe, and Carry On Jack (1963). Though preferring quality parts, he was not above journeyman work in films such as Maniac (1963) and Tales That Witness Madness (1973).

Death 
He died on 13 October 1991, of a stroke.

The house in which he was born in Tonypandy, Rhondda is marked with a Blue Plaque historical marker.  The unveiling ceremony was attended by Donald's daughter Sian, his granddaughter Michela, his sister Jean Rees and other family members and friends.  Historian Peter Stead spoke about Donald Houston's British film career at the plaque unveiling ceremony.

Selected filmography

 The Blue Lagoon (1949) as Michael Reynolds
 A Run for Your Money (1949) as Dai
 Dance Hall (1950) as Phil
 Crow Hollow (1952) as Dr. Robert Amour
 My Death Is a Mockery (1952)
 The Red Beret (1953) as Taffy
 The Large Rope (1953) as Tom Penney
 Small Town Story (1953) as Tony Warren
 Doctor in the House (1954) as Taffy Evans
 The Happiness of Three Women (1954) as John
 Devil's Point (1954) as Michael Mallard
 The Flaw (1955) as John Millway
 Doublecross (1956) as Albert Pascoe
 Find the Lady (1956) as Bill
 The Girl in the Picture (1957) as Jon Deering
 Yangtse Incident (1957) as Lt Weston RN
 The Surgeon's Knife (1957) as Dr. Alex Waring
 A Question of Adultery (1958) as Mr. Jacobus
 The Man Upstairs (1958) as Dr. Sanderson
 Room at the Top (1959) as Charles Soames
 Danger Within (1959) as Capt. Roger Byfold
 The Mark (1961) as Austin
 Twice Round the Daffodils (1962) as John Rhodes
 The 300 Spartans (1962) as Hydarnes
 The Longest Day (1962) as RAF Pilot
 Maniac (1963) as Henri
 Doctor in Distress (1963) as Maj. Tommy Ffrench
 Carry On Jack (1963) as First Officer Jonathan Howett
 633 Squadron (1964) as Group Capt. Don Barrett
 Danger Man Episode: 'The Mirror's New' (TV series 1965) - Edward Bierce
 A Study in Terror (1965) as Doctor Watson
 Gideon's Way Episode: 'Fall High, Fall Hard' (TV series 1965) - Tony Erickson (his actor brother Glyn Houston also appeared in the episode)
 Out of the Unknown Episode: 'Thirteen to Centaurus' (TV series 1965) - Dr. Francis
 The Viking Queen (1967) as Maelgan
 Where Eagles Dare (1968) as Capt. Olaf Christiansen
 The Bushbaby (1969) as John Leeds
 My Lover My Son (1970) as Robert
 Now Take My Wife (1971) as Harry Love
 Tales That Witness Madness (1973) as Sam Patterson (segment 1 "Mr. Tiger")
 Voyage of the Damned (1976) as Dr. Glauner
 The Sea Wolves (1980) as Hilliard
 Clash of the Titans (1981) as Acrisius

References

External links
 

1923 births
1991 deaths
Welsh male film actors
Welsh male television actors
Welsh people of Scottish descent
People from Clydach Vale
20th-century Welsh male actors
British male comedy actors
Royal Air Force personnel of World War II
Royal Air Force officers